Downsfield is a rural locality in the Gympie Region, Queensland, Australia. In the  Downsfield had a population of 94 people.

History 
Downsfield State School opened on 2 December 1918. It had a number of temporary closures over the years, closing finally on 29 August 1966.

In the  Downsfield had a population of 94 people.

Heritage listings 
Dagun has the following heritage site:

 1726 Sandy Creek Road: Sandy Creek Hall

References 

Gympie Region
Localities in Queensland